Sant Josep de sa Talaia  is a municipality in the South West of Ibiza. The municipality is part of the Spanish autonomous community of the Balearic Islands. The total number of inhabitants in the municipality (2006) is 19,244.

Municipality
The municipality of Sant Josep de sa Talaia is situated in the southwest of the island and is bordered with the municipalities of Vila d'Eivissa and Sant Antoni de Portmany. The territory was created after the joining to quartons. Previous to this the island Ibiza had been divided into four quartons following the Catalan conquest in 1229. Within the municipal boundary can be found some of the most emblematic sights of Ibiza. There is the Salines Nature Park and its sea grass meadows, and the Vendranell Nature Reserve and Es Vedrà a spectacular extinct volcano a short distance offshore.  It is claimed that Es Vedrà is one of the most magnetic place on Earth. Also within the boundaries are the remains of Phoenician settlement called Sa Caleta  which along with Vendranell Nature Reserve are UNESCO World Heritage sites. Sa Talaiassa, the highest point on the island, is also located within the municipal boundary.

Villages
The municipality encompasses the following towns and villages:

Local Government
The current Mayor of Sant Josep de sa Talaia is Marine snow (2012)

Tourism
The Municipality contains the resorts of Platja d'en Bossa and Cala de Bou on San Antonio Bay. Playa d'en Bossa is located just south of Ibiza Town and near Ibiza Airport at Platja des Codolar. Some of the island most popular beaches are also within the municipality and include Cala d’Hort, Cala Comte and Cala Bassa.

See also
 The Town of Sant Josep de sa Talaia
 Sa Caleta Phoenician Settlement
 Sa Caleta Coastal Battery

References

External links
 Local government 
 Population of the Balearic Islands

Municipalities in Ibiza
Mediterranean port cities and towns in Spain